Josh Dawsey is an American journalist who is a political investigations and enterprise reporter for The Washington Post.

Education 
Dawsey received a B.A. in journalism from the University of South Carolina.

Career 
Dawsey began his career as a reporter at The Wall Street Journal, first covering Governor Chris Christie before being assigned to New York to write about Mayor Bill de Blasio. He moved to Politico to become a White House reporter in 2016, before assuming the same role at The Washington Post in 2017.

Dawsey won the White House Correspondents Association's Award for Deadline Reporting in 2018 and again in 2019. He was part of a team that won the 2022 Pulitzer Prize for Public Service for its coverage of the Jan. 6 attack on the U.S. Capitol.

References

External links 
 Josh Dawsey on Twitter

Living people
Year of birth missing (living people)
The Washington Post journalists
The Washington Post people
The Wall Street Journal people
Politico people
CNN people
21st-century American journalists
21st-century American non-fiction writers
University of South Carolina alumni
American political writers